Cesse Aqueduct is one of several aqueducts, or water bridge, created for the Canal du Midi. Originally, the canal crossed the Cesse on the level.

The Cesse Aqueduct was designed in 1686 by Marshal Sebastien Vauban and completed in 1690 by Antoine Niquet.   Master mason was John Gaudot.    It has three spans, the middle being  and the side being  each.   It is located in Mirepeisset, Aude (11), Languedoc-Roussillon, France, about one mile from the port town of Le Somail.

Cesse Aqueduct dans le cinéma 
In 1967, a scene from "Le Petit Baigneur" directed by Robert Dhéry, with Louis de Funès, was filmed a Cesse Aqueduct.

See also
Locks on the Canal du Midi

References

External links 
 Eastern Approach

Aqueducts on Canal du Midi